The 2024 AFC U-20 Women's Asian Cup qualification is a scheduled women's under-20 football competition that will determine the participating teams in the 2024 AFC U-20 Women's Asian Cup final tournament. Players born on or after 1 January 2004 are eligible to participate.

A total of eight teams will qualify to play in the final tournament. The host country and the top three teams of the previous tournament in 2019 will qualify automatically, while the other four teams will be decided by qualification. There will be two rounds of qualification matches, with the first round scheduled to be played between 4 and 12 March 2023, and the second round scheduled to be played between 3 and 11 June 2023.

Draw
Of the 47 AFC member associations, a total of 31 teams entered the competition, with Japan, North Korea and South Korea automatically qualified for the final tournament by their position as the top three teams of the 2019 AFC U-19 Women's Championship qualification and thus not participating in qualification. The draw for the first round of the qualifiers was held on 3 November 2022, 14:00 MYT (UTC+8), at the AFC House in Kuala Lumpur, Malaysia.

The 31 teams were allocated to seven groups of four teams and one group of three teams, with teams seeded according to their performance in the 2019 AFC U-19 Women's Championship final tournament and qualification (overall ranking shown in parentheses; NR stands for non-ranked teams). A further restriction was also applied, with the eight teams serving as qualification group hosts drawn into separate groups.

Notes
Teams in bold automatically qualified for the final tournament.
Teams in italics advanced to second round.
(H): Qualification first round group hosts
(Q): Final tournament hosts, automatically qualified, but will participate in the Qualifiers. All of their matches in the Qualifiers will be deemed as friendlies.
(W): Withdrew after the draw

Did not enter

Player eligibility
Players born between 1 January 2004 and 31 December 2008 are eligible to compete in the tournament.

Format
In each group, teams play each other once at a centralised venue.
In the first round, the eight group winners advance to the second round. However, the final tournament hosts Uzbekistan do not advance to the second round. Their matches will also not be taken into account when calculating the group ranking.
In the second round, the two group winners and the two group runners-up qualify for the final tournament to join the four automatically qualified teams.

Tiebreakers
Teams are ranked according to points (3 points for a win, 1 point for a draw, 0 points for a loss), and if tied on points, the following tiebreaking criteria are applied, in the order given, to determine the rankings (Regulations Article 7.3):
Points in head-to-head matches among tied teams;
Goal difference in head-to-head matches among tied teams;
Goals scored in head-to-head matches among tied teams;
If more than two teams are tied, and after applying all head-to-head criteria above, a subset of teams are still tied, all head-to-head criteria above are reapplied exclusively to this subset of teams;
Goal difference in all group matches;
Goals scored in all group matches;
Penalty shoot-out if only two teams are tied and they met in the last round of the group;
Disciplinary points (yellow card = 1 point, red card as a result of two yellow cards = 3 points, direct red card = 3 points, yellow card followed by direct red card = 4 points);
Drawing of lots.

First round
The first round will be played from 6 to 12 March 2023.

Group A
All matches will be held in Laos.
Times listed are UTC+7.

Group B
All matches will be held in Palestine.
Times listed are UTC+2.

Group C
All matches will be held in Kyrgyzstan.
Times listed are UTC+6.

Group D
All matches will be held in Jordan.
Times listed are UTC+3.

Group E
All matches will be held in Thailand.
Times listed are UTC+7.
Uzbekistan will compete in the qualifiers, but their matches will not be taken into account when calculating the group ranking.

Group F
All matches will be held in Vietnam.
Times listed are UTC+7.

Group G
All matches will be held in Cambodia.
Times listed are UTC+7.

Group H
All matches will be held in Bangladesh.
Times listed are UTC+6.

Second round
The draw for the second round of the qualifiers will be held on 23 March 2023, 15:00 MYT (UTC+8), at the AFC House in Kuala Lumpur, Malaysia.

For the second round, the eight teams will be drawn into two groups of four teams. The teams will be seeded according to their performance in the 2019 AFC U-19 Women's Championship final tournament and qualification.
The two group hosts will be determined after the draw.

Notes
Teams in bold qualified for the final tournament.

The second round will be played between 3 and 11 June 2023.

Group A

Group B

Qualified teams
The following eight teams qualified for the final tournament.

1 Bold indicates champions for that year. Italic indicates hosts for that year.

Goalscorers

Notes

See also
2024 AFC U-17 Women's Asian Cup qualification
2024 AFC Women's Olympic Qualifying Tournament
2024 AFC U-23 Asian Cup qualification

References

External links
, the-AFC.com

Qualification
U-20 Women's Asian Cup qualification
2023 in women's association football
2023 in youth association football
March 2023 sports events in Asia
June 2023 sports events in Asia